Aage Ulrik Jensen (13 December 1915 – 25 January 1995) was a Danish coxswain. He competed at the 1936 Summer Olympics in Berlin with the men's coxed pair where they came fourth.

References

External links 
 

1915 births
1995 deaths
Danish male rowers
Olympic rowers of Denmark
Rowers at the 1936 Summer Olympics
Rowers from Copenhagen
Coxswains (rowing)
European Rowing Championships medalists